The 2011-12 FFHG Division 1 season was contested by 14 teams, and saw the Scorpions de Mulhouse win the championship. They were promoted to the Ligue Magnus as result. The Jokers de Cergy-Pontoise and the Lynx de Valence were relegated to FFHG Division 2.

Regular season

Playoffs

External links
Season on hockeyarchives.info

FFHG Division 1 seasons
2
Fra